Hayley Rose Bowden  (née Moorwood; born 13 February 1984) is a women's association footballer who has represented New Zealand at international level.

Club career
In 2003 and 2004, Bowden played varsity soccer for Southwest Baptist University in Missouri. She represented Virginia Commonwealth University in 2005, scoring three goals in 23 appearances. In 2009, she made nine appearances for Ottawa Fury.

Bowden played most of her club football in New Zealand before signing a one-year deal with Chelsea for the 2011 FA WSL season. In 2013, she joined Lincoln Ladies.

International career
Bowden scored on her Football Ferns debut, a 15–0 victory over Samoa on 7 April 2003, and represented New Zealand at the 2007 FIFA Women's World Cup finals in China, where they lost to Brazil 0–5, Denmark (0–2) and China (0–2).

Bowden was also included in the New Zealand squad for the 2008 Summer Olympics where they drew with Japan (2–2) before losing to Norway (0–1) and Brazil (0–4).

Bowden earned her 50th cap for New Zealand in a 3–0 win over Scotland as they progressed to the Cyprus Cup final on 1 March 2010, becoming only the fourth New Zealand woman to reach the milestone.
She went on to surpass Wendi Henderson's record for New Zealand women's international appearances when she earned her 65th cap against Colombia on 19 June 2011. She returned to the national team after giving birth to a son, only to announce her retirement from international football on 11 May 2015. She finished her career with 92 caps and 10 goals for New Zealand.

In the 2016 New Year Honours, Bowden was appointed a Member of the New Zealand Order of Merit for services to football.

Personal life
Bowden's partner is New Zealand rugby union player Daniel Bowden. She accompanied him when he left New Zealand to join London Irish.

Honours
Individual
 IFFHS OFC Woman Team of the Decade 2011–2020

References

External links
 
 New Zealand Football profile

1984 births
Living people
Women's association football midfielders
New Zealand women's association footballers
Olympic association footballers of New Zealand
Footballers at the 2008 Summer Olympics
Footballers at the 2012 Summer Olympics
Women's Super League players
Chelsea F.C. Women players
Notts County L.F.C. players
Expatriate women's footballers in England
2007 FIFA Women's World Cup players
2011 FIFA Women's World Cup players
New Zealand women's international footballers
New Zealand expatriate sportspeople in England
Virginia Commonwealth University alumni
Members of the New Zealand Order of Merit
New Zealand expatriate sportspeople in Canada
New Zealand expatriate sportspeople in the United States
VCU Rams women's soccer players
Southwest Baptist Bearcats women's soccer players
Expatriate women's soccer players in the United States
Expatriate women's soccer players in Canada
New Zealand expatriate women's association footballers
Ottawa Fury (women) players